Somotor  is a village and municipality in the Trebišov District in the Košice Region of south-eastern Slovakia.

Geography
The village lies at an altitude of 109 metres and covers an area of 16.309 km².
It has a population of about 1665 people.

History
In historical records the village was first mentioned in 1214. The town was given a charter as a town in 1263 in a document mentioning "terrum Zomothor." The current Hungarian name of Szomotor was adopted in the late 1800s and even after the partitioning of Hungary, leaving Szomotor now in the new country of Czechoslovakia. The name remained Szomotor until 1927 when the Czech government changed it to Somotor to conform with Czech and Slovak spelling.
[Historical records state that] Slavic linguists say that the name of the town comes from the word "cmotr" (to look) however when the town was founded there was no evidence of Slavic inhabitants. Hungarian linguists say it comes from Szomoru Tor, which means sad funeral (wake) which took place after the death of Chief Ond (after the arrival of the Magyars in the 980s.) The area was inhabited by the Magyars after their arrival.

A Jewish community did exist in this town prior to World War II, which was destroyed in 1944 by Nazi Germany. A Jewish cemetery exists in this town (the name of the town is spelled in Hebrew: סאמאטאר

Ethnicity
The village is roughly 70% Hungarian and 28% Slovak and 2% Gypsy.

Facilities
The village has a public library a gym and a football pitch

External links
 Official Town Website
http://www.statistics.sk/mosmis/eng/run.html
 KÉKNEFELEJCS folk collective

Villages and municipalities in Trebišov District
Hungarian communities in Slovakia